Peter "Jonker" Johnson (born  in Langley Park, County Durham) is a retired British ice hockey player. He is mainly remembered for playing for the Durham Wasps during the 1960s, 1970s and 1980s. He also played for the Great Britain national team in 1971 and 1973. He was inducted into the British Ice Hockey Hall of Fame in 1989.

External links

1946 births
British Ice Hockey Hall of Fame inductees
Cleveland Bombers players
Durham Wasps players
English ice hockey forwards
Living people
People from Langley Park, County Durham
Sportspeople from County Durham